Kai Tak Central & South, previously Kai Tak South, is one of the 25 constituencies in the Kowloon City District of Hong Kong which was first created in for the 2015 District Council elections.

The constituency loosely covers part of Tak Long Estate as well as some other residential areas in San Po Kong and the previous Kai Tak Airport with the estimated population of 12,653.

Councillors represented

Election results

2010s

References

Constituencies of Hong Kong
Constituencies of Kowloon City District Council
2015 establishments in Hong Kong
Constituencies established in 2015
Kai Tak Development